Schimmelarij (also: Schimmelerij) is a hamlet in the Netherlands and is part of the Coevorden municipality in Drenthe.

Schimmelarij is not a statistical entity, and the postal authorities have placed it under Holsloot. It was first mentioned in 1867 as Schimmelderij, and means "belonging to the Schimmel family". It was called Schimmelerij until a hay wagon destroyed the place name sign, and the municipality of Sleen replaced it with a "Schimmelarij" sign. The hamlet consists of about 6 houses.

Notable people 
 Don Diablo (born 1980), DJ, record producer, and musician

References 

Coevorden
Populated places in Drenthe